This article lists Mauritius political parties in alphabetical order. Mauritius has a multi-party system with numerous political parties, in which no one party often has a chance of gaining power alone, and parties must work with each other to form coalition governments.

Active parties

Parties represented in the National Assembly of Mauritius

Parties without representation

Defunct and merged parties

Former alliances

Parties in Rodrigues
Political parties in Rodrigues island.

See also

 Politics of Mauritius
 List of political parties by country

References

Politics of Mauritius
Mauritius
 
Political parties
Political parties
Mauritius